Colm Keegan (born 2 August 1989) is a singer, songwriter and teacher from Dublin, Ireland. He was formerly a principal singer with Irish music group, Celtic Thunder, as well as previously performing with the likes of Celtic Woman, The Priests, and Irish tenor Peter Corry. He released his first solo album "I'll Never Be Alone" in the fall of 2016. He is currently touring with his wife, Laura, on various solo tours.

Personal life 
Keegan married Celtic Thunder cellist Laura Durrant on 26 July 2016. The couple had a baby boy, Oisín, in 2017. In November 2018, their daughter Isla was born. Keegan announced her birth on Instagram the next day

Habemus 
In 2005, Colm's oldest brother John established a chamber choir consisting of alumni Choral Scholars of University College Dublin and singers from Dublin's Palestrina Choir, giving them the name Habemus Chamber Choir. The word Habemus stems from the Latin "we have".

Today, the a cappella musical group consists of 16 singers selected from a variety of Dublin-based chamber choirs, choral foundations and university scholarship programmes. The primary focus for the choir is to utilize its musical talents to help promote awareness through charity fundraising concerts. Since its foundation, Habemus have raised in excess of 20,000 euro for almost a dozen local and international charities and continue to have the desire to help others through music.

Choral Scholarship at University College Dublin 
In 2008-2009 and again in 2010–2011, following a competitive selection process, Colm was awarded a singing scholarship with the Choral Scholars of University College Dublin under the direction of Dr Desmond Earley. The group's repertoire ranges from art to popular music, and medieval to contemporary in style.

Colm was also offered a Scholarship position with Dublin Choral Foundation's Lassus Scholars. Here Colm returned to singing with his former choir director of Dublin's Palestrina Choir, Ite O'Donovan, the lady who introduced Colm to both singing and Music as a young 4 year old and the person Colm refers to as the biggest influence on his Musical life.

Colm spent his weekends in University teaching singing in the Habemus Performing Arts School, a school designed to encourage, educate and promote students in the disciplines of Singing, Acting and Dancing through classes and workshops. During this time, he was also appearing as guest assistant Musical Director for a number of amateur musical productions including West Side Story, HMS Pinafore and Pirates of Penzance. Colm's name was quickly spreading around the city and was asked to put on a number of projects including putting together a night of music for the children in Dublin's Central Remedial Clinic.

Celtic Woman 
Whilst still in College, Colm was invited to join the Aontas Choral Ensemble, the touring choir of Irish music group Celtic Woman. Colm recorded as a member of the choir for the "Songs From The Heart" CD and DVD Public Television special. Upon graduating from University College Dublin, he completed two European tours, a tour of Asia, the making of "Believe" CD and DVD, and a five-month North American tour with the production. Colm spent a year with the group before leaving to join Celtic Thunder.

Celtic Thunder 
In May 2012, Colm was invited by producer Sharon Browne to join Celtic Thunder and first performed with the group in June of that year at Harrah's Resort and Casino in Atlantic City, New Jersey. Later that year, he filmed "Mythology", his debut DVD and CD as a principal member. He has subsequently toured the United States and Canada numerous times as a principal member of the group, including a special one-off 'unplugged' concert in New York during December 2012, which raised approximately $50,000 in aid of the victims of Hurricane Sandy. In 2014, Colm toured in Australia for the first time; He has also sailed on the Celtic Thunder Cruise in both 2013 and 2014 as one of the star performers. In early 2016, Keegan announced that he would be taking a year's break from Celtic Thunder to finish attending university.

CKonTour 
Mid 2014, Colm teamed up with Celtic Thunder musician Laura Durrant to release a debut single of the Tony Arata song "The Dance". The song soon went to #1 on iTunes World Music Charts, #1 bestseller on Amazon and #1 on Hot New Releases on CD Baby.

Upon returning from his first tour of Australia with Celtic Thunder, Colm and Laura decided to join forces and tour together, and from there, CKonTour was born. In August 2014, the duo embarked on a two-week solo tour of the United States East Coast. In contrast to the thousands of fans for whom the duo performed with Celtic Thunder, CKonTour provided fans with a chance to see Colm and Laura perform a completely acoustic set in smaller, more intimate venues. The setlist for a CKonTour show is a perfect blend of original songs, Irish classics and contemporary favourites.

Early in 2015, Colm was voted Best New Irish Artist for 2014 in the Irish Music Awards (IMA). The IMA is an annual awards presentation hosted by the Irish Music Association to honour the best in Irish Music and helps to promote and support Irish music and musicians worldwide. 2015 also saw Colm release another single, this time recording with his brothers the Irish classic "Raglan Road". This song, too, rose to #1 on the iTunes World music charts.

On the back of releasing the music video for Colm's original song "Waves of Future", Colm and Laura took CKonTour on the road again, this time performing 22 dates across the United States, including headlining the Rocky Mountain Irish Festival in Colorado, and an online StageIt show which was streamed live around the world.

CKonLine 
When off tour from Celtic Thunder, Colm doesn't forget about his other passion, teaching. He has helped out around Ireland teaching at several Performing Arts and Secondary schools offering advice and tuition in both music performance as well as the academic side to the subject.

Making use of his previous teaching experience, Colm launched his newest project, CKonLine, in July 2015. An idea that was months in the making, CKonLine is an online teaching forum where people from around the world can study a range of subjects with Colm as their teacher.

The inaugural summer term of CKonLine offered individual or group classes learning Music Theory, at beginner, intermediate and advanced levels, dependent on his students existing knowledge. This unique project gives people an opportunity to learn a subject from a passionate, experienced and driven teacher.

"This unique, exciting prospect bears no limits to what can be achieved. We can take people with no experience in Music theory and have them reading music and, more importantly, understanding music in just a matter of weeks."

Irish History will be introduced in the upcoming Autumn term commencing September, with more subjects to be added to the syllabus in future terms, including Irish Mythology and Irish Language.

Discography

Filmography

References

External links
 
 CKonLine Website
 Colm Keegan Official Facebook
 Celtic Thunder

Musicians from Dublin (city)
Irish male singer-songwriters
Living people
1989 births
Alumni of University College Dublin
21st-century Irish male singers